RNDM is an American alternative rock band formed in 2012, consisting of Pearl Jam's bassist Jeff Ament, singer-songwriter Joseph Arthur and drummer Richard Stuverud. They released their first album, Acts, on 30 October 2012. Their second album Ghost Riding was released on March 4, 2016.

Discography
Acts (2012)
Ghost Riding (2016)

References

External links

 

2012 establishments in the United States
American musical trios
American alternative rock groups
Musical groups established in 2012